The Nyanga (also Banianga, Banyanga, Kinyanga, Nianga or Nyangas) are a Bantu people in the African Great Lakes region. Today they live predominantly in the Kivu region of the Democratic Republic of the Congo, near the frontier with Rwanda and Uganda. They speak the Nyanga language, also called Kinyanga, which is one of the Bantu languages. There are about 150,000 speakers of Nyanga according to a 1994 census, but most are also fluent in Swahili. Their national epic is the karisi Mwindo.

Notes

Further reading
Biebuyck, Daniel P. De hond bij de Nyanga: ritueel en sociologie. Gembloux: J. Duculot, 1956.